Alexandre Guyader (born 1 March 1981) is a French windsurfer. He competed in the men's Mistral One Design event at the 2000 Summer Olympics.

References

External links
 
 

1981 births
Living people
French male sailors (sport)
French windsurfers
Olympic sailors of France
Sailors at the 2000 Summer Olympics – Mistral One Design
Place of birth missing (living people)